Halgerda rubicunda is a species of sea slug, a dorid nudibranch, shell-less marine gastropod mollusks in the family Discodorididae.

Distribution 
This species was described from Japan. It has been reported from the Kerama Islands.

Description
Length 1–3 cm. Body elongate-elliptical, the ends equally rounded. Back firm, raised into finely reticulated ridges, with distinct knobs at the points where these ridges join. Branchial plumes 5, bi- or tripinnate. Margins of branchial cavity wavy with 5 valves. Oral tentacles digitiform. General body colour orange-red, a short longitudinal band of dull yellow medianly between the rhinophores, and there is another, but transverse, band of the same colour a short distance in front of the branchiae. No labial plates. Radula formula about 25 X 23-25.0.23-25. The outermost (3-4) laterals finely pectinated at tip, all the remaining laterals simply hamate and smooth.

References

Discodorididae
Gastropods described in 1949